Inderlok (formerly called Trinagar) is a Delhi Metro station located in Delhi, on the Red and Green Lines. It is a transfer station between the Red Line and the Green Line. The station is the terminal for the Green Line to Brigadier Hoshiyar Singh metro station, which is located in Bahadurgarh district of Haryana. One interesting thing about the Inderlok station is that the Green Line meets the Red Line perpendicularly here, unlike all the other interchange stations. This design choice ended the possibility of extending the line in the future (in this direction).

Station layout 
Red Line Station Layout

Green Line Station Layout

Facilities
The station has the following facilities:

ATM: PNB ATM near gate number 1
Toilet: 2 Sulabh Toilets near gate number 1 and gate number 5
Food / Restaurant: WH Smith and Munch with Ava on the paid concourse
Stores: Comesum, Raymond, Doeacc Society, Big Bazaar, Rachna Cafe, Hot 'n' Chilli

Exits

See also
List of Delhi Metro stations
Transport in Delhi
Delhi Metro Rail Corporation
Delhi Suburban Railway
List of rapid transit systems in India
Delhi Transport Corporation
List of Metro Systems

References

External links

 Delhi Metro Rail Corporation Ltd. (Official site) 
 Delhi Metro Annual Reports
 
 UrbanRail.Net – descriptions of all metro systems in the world, each with a schematic map showing all stations.

Delhi Metro stations
Railway stations opened in 2003
Railway stations in North West Delhi district